Sport Vereniging Papatam  is an association football club from Albina, Suriname. The club currently compete in the SVB Eerste Klasse, the 2nd tier of football in Suriname. In 2013 their home stadium the Albina Stadium was completed by the Albina Sport Bond, with a capacity of 1,000 people.

Achievements
Interdistrictentoernooi
Winners: 1997
Runner-up: 2004

Lidbondentoernooi
Runner-up: 2012

References

External links
 Papatam at SVB.sr

Papatam